Dracy is a commune in the Yonne department in Bourgogne-Franche-Comté in north-central France.

Geography
The river Ouanne forms part of the commune's eastern border, flows north-westward through the north-eastern part of the commune, crosses the village and forms part of its northern border.

See also
Communes of the Yonne department

References

Communes of Yonne